The Science Media Centre is a charitable company, first formed in 2002, two years after the United Kingdom House of Lords Select committee on Science and Technology's third report on "Science and Society" in 2000.

This report stated that while science was generally reported accurately in the mass media, there was a need for the promotion of more expert information at times when science is under attack in the headlines, mentioning the public reaction to GM crops, in particular.

Functions
In order to promote more informed science in the media, the centre's main function is as a service to journalists, providing background briefings on current scientific issues and facilitating interviews with scientists. Comments are also sourced from scientists about breaking news stories, to provide an independent expert commentary on the news, so that press releases have some peer review. Independence means from the breaking news story, and scientists commenting are asked to declare any competing interests they have with their comment.

Its director is Fiona Fox who is a former member of the Revolutionary Communist Party and a former contributor to its magazine Living Marxism.

Aims
The SMC's stated aim is to "facilitate more scientists to engage with the media, in the hope that the public will have improved access to accurate, evidence-based scientific information about the stories of the day". More baldly, the philosophy is "the media will do science better when scientists do the media better".

Structure
The setting up of the Science Media Centre was assisted by Susan Greenfield, the director of the Royal Institution of Great Britain. While the centre was initially based in a specially refurbished wing of the Royal Institution, full independence was claimed from all funders and supporters. The SMC is now hosted by the Wellcome Trust.

The Science Media Centre is funded by over 60 organisations, with individual donations capped at £12,500 per annum. The SMC receives sponsorship from a range of funders including media organisations, universities, scientific and learned societies, the UK Research Councils, government bodies, Quangos, charities, private donors and corporate bodies. For an up-to-date list of funders, see .

As well as having a board of trustees, the SMC maintains an advisory board of science and media experts to consult on its strategy.

Criticism

Criticism of the SMC relates to perceptions of independence: in respect of funding sources relating industry with an interest in some science applications, in respect of scientists promoting specific views in favour of their own research in response to news stories, and promoting science establishment concerns particularly in respect of funding for science.

A 2013 article in Nature stated about the SMC, "Perhaps the biggest criticism of Fox and the SMC is that they push science too aggressively – acting more as a PR agency than as a source of accurate science information."

In 2002, Ronan Bennett and Alan Rusbridger described the SMC as a lobby group.

Other SMCs
During Professor Greenfield's term as Thinker in Residence in South Australia, a new Australian Science Media Centre was set up in Adelaide, Australia in August 2005.

Science Media Centres exist in other countries such as Japan; except for the relation between the Science Media Centre in UK and the Australian Science Media Centre, these centres are independent of each other.

The Science Media Centre of Canada was founded in 2008.

The New Zealand Science Media Centre was launched on 30 June 2008

The Science Media Center Germany was founded in 2015 with €1.5 million in seed money by Klaus Tschira, founder of the software company SAP SE.

References

External links
 Science Media Centre
 Australian SMC
 Science Media Centre of Canada
 Science Media Centre of New Zealand
 Profile at SourceWatch
 George Monbiot on Science Media Centre
 Robin McKie, Lobby group 'led GM thriller critics', The Guardian'', 2 June 2002
About the Science Media Centers & the Press, By Fiona Fox and Connie St. Louis 2013

Audio clips
 Leading Edge March 2009
 Leading Edge December 2008

Science in society
Science and technology in the United Kingdom
Organizations established in 2000
Scientific organisations based in the United Kingdom
2000 establishments in the United Kingdom
Works about science